Portrait of a Bookstore as an Old Man is a 2003 documentary film directed by Benjamin Sutherland and Gonzague Pichelin. It is about George Whitman who opened a bookshop-commune in Paris in 1951 called Shakespeare and Company.

References

External links

American documentary films
2003 films
2003 documentary films
American independent films
Documentary films about Paris
2000s French-language films
Documentary films about businesspeople
Works about book publishing and bookselling
2003 independent films
2000s English-language films
2000s American films